The following is a list of dahlia cultivars which have gained the Royal Horticultural Society's Award of Garden Merit. They are tuberous perennials, originally from South America, with showy daisy-like composite flowerheads in all shades and combinations of white, yellow, orange, pink and red, flowering in late summer and autumn (fall). Much work has been done on the development of a range of flower shapes and sizes. They may be sold as dry tubers in Spring, and started off in heat before being planted out after all danger of frost has passed. Alternatively they can be purchased later in the season, in pots ready to flower. Dwarf bedding types are usually cultivated as annuals and discarded after flowering. In mild areas without penetrating frosts, mature plants can be overwintered in the garden; otherwise, they are lifted and stored in a frost free place. They are easily propagated from cuttings in Spring.

Flower shapes can be divided into 14 main groups:-
single: less than  - open centred, with a single or double row of ray florets
waterlily: miniature, small or medium sized blooms - double, with a small number of flattened, rounded ray florets
collerette:  - single row of flat ray florets surrounding an inner collar of shorter florets and a central disc
anemone-flowered:  - upward-pointing, tubular florets, surrounded by one or more rows of flattened ray florets
pompon:  - tightly spherical small blooms with florets in a scale-like arrangement
ball: similar to pompon but larger in size
semi-cactus: double flowers in a range of sizes; many pointed, recurved ray florets
cactus: double flowers in a range of sizes; many pointed, recurved ray florets that are narrower than semi-cactus flowers
decorative: fully double flowers with the central disc completely hidden; the broad florets may be pointed and twisted
miscellaneous: including peony-flowered, orchid-flowered, chrysanthemum-flowered, dwarf bedding

As of 2015, 124 cultivars are listed. Maximum dimensions of plants are shown in centimetres.

References

dahlias
Dahlia